Lee Hwi-hyang (born October 1, 1960) is a South Korean actress. She joined the Miss MBC beauty pageant in 1981, and made her acting debut in 1982. Among Lee's notable television dramas are Love and Ambition (1987), Forget Tomorrow (1988), Ambitious Times (1990), and The Beginning of Happiness (1996).

Filmography

Television series

Film

Theater

Awards and nominations

References

External links 
 Lee Hwi-hyang Fan Cafe at Daum 
 
 
 
 

1960 births
Living people
South Korean television actresses
South Korean film actresses
South Korean stage actresses
Seoul Institute of the Arts alumni
Best Actress Paeksang Arts Award (television) winners